Bhookailas is a 1940 Telugu film produced by A. V. Meiyappan and directed by Sundar Rao Nadkarni. The film starred Subbaiah Naidu, R. Nagendra Rao, and Rayaprolu Subramanyam. It was the first hit film after the establishment of AVM Productions.

It was adapted from the famous Kannada stage play Bhookailasa by Sri Sahitya Samrajya Nataka Mandali of Mysore.

Plot 
Demon King Ravana (Subbaiah Naidu) decides to invade Amaravati, the capital of the heavenly kingdom of Indra. Scared of Ravana's plans, Indra asks Narada (R. Nagendra Rao) for help. Narada informs Indra that Ravana's strength comes from the worship performed by Kaikasi (Parvathi Bai), Ravana's mother. He suggests that Indra sabotage Ravana's mother's worship of Saikatha Lingam, a sand sculpture representation of Lord Siva (Rayaprolu Subramanyam).

Ravana decides to perform penance and bring Lord Siva's Atma Lingam for his mother to worship. Hearing of Ravana's plans from Narada, Goddess Parvathi (Hymavathi), Lord Siva's consort, appeals to Lord Vishnu. When Lord Siva appears to Ravana to grant his wish, Lord Vishnu manipulates Ravana's mind and makes him wish for Goddess Parvathi. As Ravana proceeds home with Goddess Parvathi, Narada meets him midway and tells him that his companion is a fake Parvathi. Dejected by the subterfuge, Ravana returns Goddess Parvathi to Lord Siva.

During his return journey, he meets Mandodari (Lakshmi Bai), the young princess of Pathala. Believing she is the real Goddess Parvathi, he marries her. Eventually, he realizes what happened and appeals to Lord Siva for forgiveness by presenting his severed head. Lord Siva presents Ravana with Atma Lingam and warns him that, if the Atma Lingam ever touches the earth, it can never be moved again. Narada instigates Lord Vinayaka to trick Ravana into grounding the Atma Lingam at what later became known as Gokarna Kshethram in Karnataka.

Cast

 Subbaiah Naidu as Ravana
 R. Nagendra Rao as Narada
 Rayaprolu Subramanyam as Shiva
 Hymavathi as Parvathi
 Parvathi Bai as Kaikasi, mother of Ravana
 Kamalabai as Vishnu Maya
 M. Satyanarayana as Mayasura
 Lakshmi Bai as Mandodari, daughter of Mayasura
 Master Viswam as young Ganesha

Soundtrack
There are about 18 songs and poems in the film. Some of the songs are very popular. Lyrics are penned by Balijepalli Lakshmikantham. The music score is provided by R. Sudarsanam.

Adaptations

References

External links
 

1940 films
Indian black-and-white films
1940s Telugu-language films
AVM Productions films
Films based on the Ramayana
Indian musical drama films
1940s musical drama films
Films scored by R. Sudarsanam
Films directed by Sundar Rao Nadkarni
1940 drama films